Santana is a Spanish and Portuguese surname, and is used by the following people:

Adria Santana (1948–2011), Cuban actress
Alencar Santana (born 1976), Brazilian politician
Bianca Santana (born 1984), Brazilian writer, researcher, journalist and teacher
Carlos Santana (born 1947), Mexican–American guitarist
Dennis Santana (born 1996), pitcher in Major League Baseball
Ervin Santana (born 1982), Major League Baseball Pitcher for the Minnesota Twins
Johan Santana (born 1979), pitcher in Major League Baseball
Jorge Santana (1951-2020), musician and brother of Carlos Santana
Juelz Santana (born 1982), American rapper
Lizé Santana (born 1980), American singer-songwriter
Luan Santana (born 1991), Brazilian singer
Manuel Santana (1938–2021), tennis player
Salvador Santana (born 1983), musician and son of Carlos Santana
Pedro Santana (1801–1864), first President of the Dominican Republic
Rodrigão (Rodrigo Santana, born 1979), Brazilian volleyball player
Tito Santana (born 1953), ring name of American professional wrestler Merced Solis

Football (soccer) players
Cléber Santana (1981–2016), Brazilian footballer
Fidelis Junior Santana da Silva (born 1981), Brazilian football midfielder
Joel Santana (born 1948), former football player and coach for the South African national football team
Jonathan Santana (born 1981), naturalized Paraguayan football midfielder
Mario Santana (born 1981), Argentine football midfielder
Pedro Aparecido Santana (born 1973), Brazilian football striker
Rodrigo Marques de Santana (born 1982), Brazilian football midfielder
Suso Santana (born 1985), Spanish football winger
Telê Santana (1931–2006), a Brazilian football player and manager

See also
Santana (disambiguation)
Santa Ana (disambiguation)

Toponymic surnames